Pieter Rutter Cullis  is a Canadian physicist and biochemist known for his contributions to the field of lipid nanoparticles (LNP). Lipid nanoparticles are essential to current mRNA vaccines as a delivery system. Prof. Cullis is best known for the development of ionizable cationic lipids. These lipids are able to complex with negatively charged nucleic acids at low pH (≈4.0) where they are positively charged because they have a pKa if approximately 6.4. They reduce or eliminate toxicity associated with cationic lipids at physiological pH of 7.4 because they adopt a net neutral charge. Finally, they enable endosomal escape because they again become positively charged in acidified endosomes and promote formation of non-bilayer structures by interaction with negatively charged lipids. These properties are critical to the function of the mRNA vaccines and are rapidly enabling gene therapy in clinical settings.

Cullis co-founded several companies to develop and commercialize LNP technology including Acuitas Therapeutics, Integrated Nanotherapeutics and Precision NanoSystems.

Research
Cullis received a PhD in physics from the University of British Columbia and then moved to Oxford University to work as a postdoctoral fellow in biochemistry working on NMR. During his time at Oxford, he started to work on lipids. In the 1980s, he established his own laboratory at the University of British Columbia and started to create lipid bilayers and founded Inex Pharmaceuticals, where they researched ways to encapsulate drugs and nucleic acids within the lipid particles. He worked on the development of Patisiran, a drug that uses small interfering RNA delivered via lipid nanoparticles and was FDA approved in 2018.

Awards and Honours 
1986: Canadian Biochemical Society Ayerst Award
1991: B.C. Science Council Gold Medal for Health Sciences
2000: Alec D. Bangham Award for contributions to liposome science and technology
2002: B.C. Biotechnology Association Award for Innovation and Achievement
2004: Elected a Fellow of the Royal Society of Canada
2005: Barré Prize for contributions to Pharmaceutical Sciences by the University of Montreal
2005: UBC Alumni Award for Research in Science and Medicine
2011: Prix Galien Canada Award
2011: Bill and Marilyn Webber Lifetime Achievement Award
2021: Prince Mahidol Award in Medicine
 2022: Officer of the Order of Canada
2022: VinFuture Prize Grand Prize
2022: Camurus Lipid Research Foundation 2021 and 2020 Lipid Science Prize
2022: Canada Gairdner International Award
2022: Governor General's Innovation Award
2022: Tang Prize in Biopharmaceutical Science
2022: UBC Alumni Award of Distinction
2022: Phospholipid Research Center The Thudichum Life Award
2022: Life Sciences British Columbia Global Impact Award
2022: Bloom Burton Award
2023: Killam Prize for Health Sciences

References

20th-century Canadian physicists
Living people
Officers of the Order of Canada
Scientists from Vancouver
1946 births